Eton Centris is a development in Quezon City by Lucio Tan's Eton Properties Philippines. Eton Centris is located at the southeast corner of EDSA and Quezon Avenue. It is a major component of the Triangle Park business district.

History

Eton Centris was announced in October 2008 as Eton's second major mixed-use development township project, after the  Eton City in Santa Rosa, Laguna. In total, the development was planned to have seven office buildings and ten high-end residential condominiums.

Eton Centris was originally being developed by Paramount Land Equities, another Lucio Tan-controlled company. In 2009, Eton Properties purchased the Centris development from Paramount in exchange for 1.6 billion newly issued Eton Properties shares.

In early 2010, as Eton announced income growth of ten times for its first quarter of 2010 vs. 2009, president Danilo Ignacio stated that the company was in the planning stage to open the second BPO office. In September of the same year, Ignacio announced that Eton had begun collecting bids from contractors for the actual construction of the second BPO office.

Major tenants

The , 12-floor Eton Cyberpod Centris office building targets business process outsourcing companies. Each floor has . The building is listed as an approved IT Center by the Philippine Economic Zone Authority, making export-oriented companies located therein eligible for temporary tax holiday, permanent reduced rate of corporate income tax, and other incentives.

SM Hypermarket was chosen as the anchor store for the complex's mall in October 2008. In September 2009, Indian BPO giant Wipro Technologies announced that it would rent  of office space in Eton Cyberpod Centris, with a commitment to expand by another 33%. It was Wipro's second Philippine office after the Cebu Business Park.

References

External links

Eton Centris official website
Floorplans on Eton Cyberpod site
Eton Centris project

Mixed-use developments in Metro Manila
Science parks in Metro Manila
Quezon City